Ilam is a civil parish in the district of Staffordshire Moorlands, Staffordshire, England. It contains 37 listed buildings that are recorded in the National Heritage List for England. Of these, three are listed at Grade I, the highest of the three grades, five are at Grade II*, the middle grade, and the others are at Grade II, the lowest grade.  The parish contains the village of Ilam and the surrounding area.  Many of the houses, cottages and the school in the village are listed.  Near to the village is Ilam Hall, a former country house, which is listed together with associated structures.  Near the hall is a listed church with listed items in the churchyard, including two ancient cross shafts.  To the north of the village is Castern Hall, another country house, which is listed together with associated structures.  The other listed buildings include farmhouses and farm buildings, bridges, and a memorial in the form of an Eleanor Cross.


Key

Buildings

References

Citations

Sources

Lists of listed buildings in Staffordshire